Patrick Brammall (born 30 March 1976) is an Australian actor and writer. He is best known for his roles as Sean Moody in the ABC comedy A Moody Christmas; as Leo Taylor in Series 5 of Channel Ten's Offspring; and as Sergeant James Hayes in the ABC series Glitch.

Early life
Brammall was born in Canberra. He was born with the rare genetic disorder prune belly syndrome and his doctors did not think he would survive. He underwent several operations and spent quite a lot of time in and out of hospital during the first 10 years of his life. He attended St Thomas the Apostle primary school in Kambah and secondary at Marist College Canberra.

Career
Patrick Brammall graduated from Victorian College of the Arts in 2001. His breakthrough role was in the 2004 television movie The Alice, which led to a starring role in the spin-off series in 2005. He also had a starring role in television series Canal Road in 2008. This was followed by many roles in television series, short films and theatre.

In 2010, he played Griff's brother Tim in the gentle comedy Griff the Invisible.

In 2012, Brammall had a starring role in two ABC comedy series – The Strange Calls as Sgt Neil Lloyd, and A Moody Christmas as Sean Moody (for which he won the AACTA Award for Best Performance in a Television Comedy). In 2013, Brammall reprised the role of Sean Moody for the eight-part series, The Moodys. He also wrote episode 5 of the series, and was consequently nominated for an Australian Writers' Guild award for Best Narrative Comedy.

In 2013 he acted in The Elegant Gentleman's Guide to Knife Fighting, a sketch comedy show for the ABC, before going on to play Rupert Murdoch in the Nine Network miniseries, Power Games: The Packer-Murdoch War, which went to air in September 2013.

Brammall also has a starring role in the ABC comedy series Upper Middle Bogan as Danny Bright, which premiered in August 2013. The second season premiered in October 2014.

In 2014, Brammall joined the main cast of the Network Ten series Offspring, playing the role of midwife Leo Taylor. He also has a co-starring role in the Josh Lawson written and directed comedy feature, The Little Death.

In 2015, he starred in both the film Ruben Guthrie and the Stan series No Activity.

In 2020, Brammall voiced Bandit's brother Rad on Bluey.

Personal life
Brammall met his first wife Samantha Nield on the set of TV series The Alice, where she was a member of the crew. The couple married in 2013, but were divorced as of September 2017. In August 2017, Brammall was reported to be dating actress Harriet Dyer. In March 2021, Brammall and Dyer married five days after they became engaged. The couple adopted their first child, a daughter, in 2021.

Filmography

Film

Television

References

External links
 

Australian male film actors
Australian male soap opera actors
Australian male stage actors
Male actors from Canberra
1977 births
Living people
21st-century Australian male actors